Kokkadichcholai is a village in Batticaloa District within the Eastern Province of Sri Lanka.

Etymology
According to legend, the name of the village comes from the Kokkatti tree.

Geography
It is located west of the provincial town of Batticaloa across from the lagoon that separates the Batticaloa district's hinterland from the populated coastal area. The general area consists of four villages, one is known as Ampilanthurai, Mahiladitivu and the other Mudalaikudah (Crocodile bay) and the main hamlet of Kokkadichcholai. Although Kokkadichcholai is a collective name for the three hamlets, the name refers to the main hamlet in local parlance. The area is known for its famous Batticaloa curd in Sri Lanka.

Kokkadicholai Thaanthonreeswarar Temple is located in the area which is popular for its miracles.

Demography
The dominant group is the Mukkuvar caste - mainly farmers, followed by service castes such as dhobys, barbers and others. There is a notion of a self-contained autonomous system of villages, presided over by the Ur-Podiyar, elected from among the Podiyars or village leaders, the role of the Ur Podiyar is considered more ceremonial than coercive. Podiyars in practice were the large landowners. It has become common for people of the area to prefix their name with Podiyar. Most are Hindus with some Christians amongst them.

See also
Prawn farm massacre
1991 Kokkadichcholai massacre

References

Villages in Batticaloa District
Manmunai South West DS Division